Ultimate Earl Klugh is a compilation album by Earl Klugh released in February 2007. It features songs from Klugh's over 30 years career, including songs from his debut album as well as collaborations with Bob James and George Benson.

Track listing 
"Angelina" – 4:51
"Living Inside Your Love" – 5:39
"Dr. Macumba" – 4:26
"Heart String" – 6:20
"Wishful Thinking" – 3:58
"Rainbow Man" – 5:23
"Brazilian Stomp" – 5:37
"Emily" – 2:47
"Midnight in San Juan" – 5:53
"Movin' On" – 4:29
"Jo Ann's Song" – 5:26
"Maybe Tonight" – 4:05

References 

2007 compilation albums
Earl Klugh albums